Brock Alexander Lunde (born February 28, 1997), better known by the ring name Brock Anderson, is an American professional wrestler signed to All Elite Wrestling (AEW). He is the son of WWE Hall of Famer Arn Anderson.

Professional wrestling career

All Elite Wrestling (2021–present) 

Prior to Lunde's first appearance he had been spotted at All Elite Wrestling (AEW) events which lead to rumors of Lunde being involved with AEW. On the March 29, 2021, episode of the podcast The Arn Show on the Ad Free Shows network, it was revealed by Lunde's father Arn Anderson that Lunde had signed a contract with AEW and had been training and paying dues. In a later episode of the podcast Anderson also revealed that Lunde had been trained by Q. T. Marshall and Glacier at the Nightmare Factory, AEW's training facility. Lunde was also trained by professional wrestler Lodi

Lunde first appeared on the June 11, 2021 (taped June 5) episode of AEW Dynamite. In an interview with Tony Schiavone, Lunde alongside his father Arn Anderson and performer/executive vice-president of AEW Cody Rhodes it is announced that Lunde would be wrestling with the company as "Brock Anderson" a new member of the Nightmare Family and his first match would be the next week. The interview was interrupted by Q. T. Marshall who would be one of the opponents in Lunde's first match and a fight ensued.

Lunde made his professional wrestling debut on June 18, 2021 (taped June 6). Lunde teamed with fellow second generation wrestler Cody Rhodes (son of Dusty Rhodes) defeating Q. T. Marshall and Aaron Solow in a match on AEW Dynamite. Lunde's father, Arn Anderson, who accompanied him to the ring hugged him and raised his hand after winning the match.

Since debuting Lunde has performed in matches on AEW Dark and AEW Dark: Elevation wrestling with and against Billy Gunn and his son Colten Gunn.

Personal life 
Lunde is the son of retired professional wrestler and WWE Hall of Famer Arn Anderson. Lunde has one brother named Barrett.

In 2015, Lunde graduated from Providence High School. In high school Lunde played football, being ranked 94th among graduating linebackers in North Carolina and 904th in the United States.

After high school Lunde went to college at East Carolina University and graduated in 2019.

Filmography

Television

References

External links 

1997 births
21st-century professional wrestlers
All Elite Wrestling personnel
American male professional wrestlers
Anderson family
East Carolina University alumni
Living people
Professional wrestlers from North Carolina
Sportspeople from Charlotte, North Carolina